Güleç is a village in the Mazgirt District, Tunceli Province, Turkey. The village is populated by Kurds of the Hormek tribe and had a population of 30 in 2021.

The hamlet of Ballıca is attached to the village.

References 

Villages in Mazgirt District
Kurdish settlements in Tunceli Province